John Edward James (born June 8, 1981) is an American businessman and politician serving as the U.S. representative from Michigan's 10th congressional district since 2023. A member of the Republican Party, James was the party's nominee in the U.S. Senate elections in Michigan in 2018 and 2020, losing the elections to Democratic incumbents Debbie Stabenow and Gary Peters, respectively. 

After losing the 2020 race, James initially declined to concede, raising concerns of electoral improprieties. He conceded on November 24, about three weeks after the election. In 2022, James declared his candidacy in Michigan's redrawn 10th congressional district, his third federal election in four years. He defeated Democratic nominee Carl Marlinga by a narrow margin.

Early life and military career
James was born in Southfield, Michigan, in 1981 and grew up Baptist in the Palmer Woods neighborhood of Detroit. He graduated from the Catholic Brother Rice High School in 1999. He graduated from the United States Military Academy (West Point) in 2004, and served eight years in the Army, participating in multiple tours of duty in Operation Iraqi Freedom as an AH-64 Apache pilot. Two of his West Point classmates are fellow Congressmen Wesley Hunt and Pat Ryan. He attended the Ranger School and became Ranger-qualified as a Captain.

James received a master's degree in supply chain management from Penn State University's Smeal College of Business and an MBA from the University of Michigan's Ross School of Business.

Business career
In 2012, James joined James Group International, where his father, John A. James, was the CEO. James Group is a global supply chain management service company; James became its director of operations, and eventually became president of James Group International and CEO of its subsidiary, Renaissance Global Logistics. Renaissance Global, based in Detroit, was the recipient of a $1–2 million Paycheck Protection Program loan during the COVID-19 pandemic.

James was named one of Detroit Business Journal's 30 in their 30s of 2012, and Michigan Chronicle's 40 under 40 of 2014. He served as a board member of the Michigan Council for Future Mobility, Michigan Minority Supplier Development Council and National Veteran Business Development Council. He serves on the Detroit Workforce Development Board.

Political career

2018 U.S. Senate race

In September 2017, James entered the Republican primary for the 2018 United States Senate election in Michigan in an attempt to unseat three-term incumbent Democrat Debbie Stabenow, as well as become Michigan's first African-American senator. Despite musician and Michigan native Kid Rock publicly toying with the idea of running for the seat for months, the primary came down to James and Grosse Pointe businessman and former Wayne County Commissioner Sandy Pensler. James was endorsed via Twitter by President Donald Trump on July 27, 2018, eleven days before the primary. James won the nomination with 55% of the vote.

On November 6, 2018, Stabenow defeated James, 52.3% to 45.8%.

Potential United Nations ambassadorship
In late November 2018, Bloomberg News reported that Trump was considering nominating James to become the United States Ambassador to the United Nations, to replace Ambassador Nikki Haley, who previously announced that she was planning to leave the Trump administration by the end of 2018. James reportedly met at the White House with Trump, Vice President Mike Pence, and Secretary of State Mike Pompeo. He was ultimately bypassed for the position. Trump announced he would appoint Heather Nauert, the Spokesperson for the United States Department of State and a former television reporter, to succeed Haley, but Nauert was never nominated and announced in February 2019 that she was withdrawing from consideration.

After Nauert's withdrawal, Trump again considered James for the ambassadorship, but eventually nominated United States Ambassador to Canada Kelly Knight Craft for the post.

2020 U.S. Senate race

Because the election margin in the 2018 Senate race was smaller than expected, James became a front-runner for the Republican nomination to take on Michigan's other incumbent Democratic senator, Gary Peters, in the 2020 election.

As well as being recruited to take on Peters, it was reported in June 2019 that the National Republican Congressional Committee was recruiting James to challenge freshman Democratic U.S. Representative Haley Stevens of Michigan's 11th congressional district.

On June 6, 2019, James announced that he was seeking the Republican nomination in 2020 to take on Peters. Michigan was one of two states in which an incumbent Democratic senator was seeking reelection during 2020 in a state won by Trump in 2016, the other being Alabama. Although the Associated Press called the race for Peters on November 4, 2020, James refused to concede, which Peters termed "pathetic." James initially insisted that the election had not been administered fairly. He established a joint legal fund with the Republican National Committee to challenge the results. James claimed there was "ample evidence" for an investigation, but offered none. He raised $2 million after the election as he sought to challenge the election results, and he unsuccessfully attempted to block certification of the results of the election, which he lost to Peters by 92,335 votes. James conceded on November 24 over social media, congratulating Peters.

During his campaign, James pledged to give 5% of his campaign contributions to charity. The James fundraising committee reported about $46.12 million in total contributions for the 2020 election and has given more than $2.36 million to charities.

U.S House of Representatives

Elections

2022 

James won the Republican primary in the 2022 election in Michigan's 10th congressional district. He defeated Democrat Carl Marlinga in the November general election.

Political positions
During his 2018 Senate campaign, James ran on a typical Republican platform, describing himself on his campaign website as "a pro-life, pro-second amendment, pro-business conservative." He emphasized his desire to defund Planned Parenthood and compared Roe v. Wade, the United States Supreme Court decision legalizing abortion, to "genocide." He opposes the death penalty, does not believe employers should be able to fire workers due to their sexual orientation, and opposes the legalization of recreational marijuana.

James says he wants to repeal and replace the Affordable Care Act (Obamacare), which he has called "a monstrosity." According to The Detroit Free Press, James was careful not to take a position on the Trump administration's lawsuit seeking to immediately strike down the entire ACA as unconstitutional. When pressed in a September 2020 interview, he said he was against the ACA lawsuit without a replacement plan in place, but did not criticize Republicans for pushing the lawsuit.

James supported Ted Cruz in the 2016 Republican Party presidential primaries. He later became a Trump supporter, and tweeted in 2018 that, if elected to the Senate, he would back Trump "2,000%." During his 2020 campaign, James accepted Trump's endorsement and campaigned alongside him. James has not been publicly critical of Trump or his actions. During a meeting with black faith leaders, James was asked whether he disagreed with Trump on anything. James said, "Everything from cutting Great Lakes funding to 'shithole countries' to speaking ill of the dead. I mean, where do you want to start?" In a leaked audio recording of a meeting with African American leaders in Michigan, James was asked why he hadn't publicly criticized Trump. He said he thought it was better to be silent in public in order to gain access to Trump. James said, "Donald Trump doesn't need less Black folks around him, he needs more," and that his goal was "achieving equity and equality for our people, not standing up on Twitter and condemning folks." During the campaign, Democrats sought to tie James to Trump, while James has said his candidacy was not a referendum on Trump.

During his 2020 campaign, James declined to take specific positions on a number of policy questions, including how the Social Security Trust Fund would be protected from the impact of a payroll tax cut, whether the Senate should vote to confirm a new Supreme Court justice to fill the vacancy created by the death of Ruth Bader Ginsburg before or after the 2020 presidential election, and whether he thinks military bases named for Confederate generals should be renamed.

Personal life
James married his wife, Elizabeth, in 2012. They have three sons. When James was still dating Elizabeth, he had an encounter with police at a mall in a suburb of Detroit in which the officers drew their guns on him; James believes that if Elizabeth had not been beside him, he might have been killed. He has also expressed his fear of being killed whenever police pull him over for a traffic stop.

James is a nondenominational Christian.

Electoral history

References

External links 
 Congressman John James official U.S. House website
 Campaign website

 James Group International
 

|-

|-

|-

1981 births
20th-century African-American people
21st-century African-American politicians
21st-century American businesspeople
21st-century American politicians
African-American business executives
African-American Christians
African-American members of the United States House of Representatives
African-American military personnel
African-American people in Michigan politics
American chief executives
Black conservatism in the United States
Brother Rice High School (Michigan) alumni
Businesspeople from Michigan
Candidates in the 2018 United States Senate elections
Candidates in the 2020 United States Senate elections
Christians from Michigan
Living people
Michigan Republicans
Military personnel from Michigan
People from Farmington Hills, Michigan
Republican Party members of the United States House of Representatives from Michigan
Ross School of Business alumni
Smeal College of Business alumni
United States Military Academy alumni
University of Michigan alumni